The electoral district of Ivanhoe is an electoral district of the Victorian Legislative Assembly. It is located in the north-eastern suburbs of Melbourne and includes the suburbs of Heidelberg, Ivanhoe, Rosanna and Macleod.

Formed in 1945 the seat had usually been fairly safe for the Liberal Party having only been won by Labor at its 1952 and 1982 landslides before the 1990s. However a redistribution prior to the 1992 election made the seat notionally Labor. Liberal candidate Vin Heffernan was able to win at that election, only to be one of just three sitting Liberals defeated at the 1996 election. Labor's Craig Langdon held the seat comfortably until he resigned from the parliament on 25 August 2010, citing family and personal reasons, as well as "disloyalty and betrayal" from several of his colleagues. Langdon had failed to gain pre-selection for the 2010 state election, and there was speculation that his early resignation would trigger a by-election in Ivanhoe. In fact, on 13 September a by-election writ was issued, but the next day House Speaker Jenny Lindell announced that she would discharge the writ citing significant expense to hold a by-election three weeks before the full state election.

Members for Ivanhoe

Election results

References

External links
 Electorate profile: Ivanhoe District, Victorian Electoral Commission

Electoral districts of Victoria (Australia)
1945 establishments in Australia
City of Banyule
Electoral districts and divisions of Greater Melbourne